Aaron Heffernan (born 23 February 1990) is an Irish actor known for his roles in Love/Hate, Brassic, " Obsession:Dark Desires" and War of the Worlds.

Background
Heffernan grew up in Dublin, Ireland. His father, David, is a radio producer. Aaron has two older brothers: Simon, a personal trainer; and Jesse, a hip hop artist. His first cousin is model Thalia Heffernan. He studied drama and classics at Trinity College Dublin. In 2012, he co-founded the Collapsing Horse Theatre Company with fellow student and actor Jack Gleeson.

Filmography

References

External links 
 

21st-century Irish actors
Irish male television actors
Irish male film actors
Irish male stage actors
Living people
Alumni of Trinity College Dublin
Black Irish people
1990 births